Greta Gynt (born Margrethe Woxholt; 15 November 1916 – 2 April 2000) was a Norwegian dancer and actress. She is remembered for her starring roles in the British classic films The Dark Eyes of London, Mr. Emmanuel, Take My Life, Dear Murderer and The Ringer.

She played lead roles in minor British films in the 1930s and early 40s, and by the late 40s she appeared in major films. The Rank Organisation tried to market her as the British Jean Harlow. She also attempted a career in the US, starring in MGM's Soldiers Three (1951) before returning to Britain.

Her most famous films are the 1939 Bela Lugosi film The Dark Eyes of London as the tough heroine, heroic as an underground leader in Tomorrow We Live (1943), touching as Jewish Elsie Silver in Mr. Emmanuel (1944), forceful as loyal wife proving her husband's innocence in the thriller Take My Life, a promiscuous murderess in Dear Murderer, both in 1947, and as a nightclub singer singing "The Shady Lady Spiv" in Easy Money (1948).

Biography

Early life 
Greta Gynt was born Margrethe Woxholt in Oslo, Norway. As a child, she moved with her parents to Britain and started dancing lessons at the age of 5. Eventually, they moved back to Norway. At age 12, she started as a dancer at the Chat Noir shows in Oslo.

After the Swedish film The Song to Her (1934), her mother, costume designer Kirsten Woxholt, felt Gynt would have better luck in Britain. She got a letter of recommendation from Fox Film and moved back to the UK.

Move to the UK 
Gynt had a minor role in It Happened in Paris (1935) and a larger one in Boys Will Be Girls (1937) and The Last Curtain (1938). She was in Second Best Bed (1938), a Tom Walls farce; The Last Barricade (1938); Sexton Blake and the Hooded Terror (1938) with Tod Slaughter; Too Dangerous to Live (1939); and She Couldn't Say No (1939).

Gynt had the female lead in The Arsenal Stadium Mystery (1939); The Dark Eyes of London (1939) with Bela Lugosi; Bulldog Sees It Through (1940) and The Middle Watch (1940) with Jack Buchanan; Two for Danger (1940) with Barry K. Barnes; Room for Two (1940) with Vic Oliver; and Crook's Tour (1940) with Basil Radford and Naunton Wayne.

She continued with leading roles in The Common Touch (1941); Tomorrow We Live (1943); It's That Man Again (1944) with Tommy Handley; and Mr. Emmanuel (1944) with Felix Aylmer.

Gynt supported Sid Field in London Town (1946), a notorious big budget flop.

Stardom 
Gynt was given star parts in the crime films Dear Murderer (1947), and Take My Life (1947). She was top billed in the comedy Easy Money (1948), and in the drama The Calendar (1948).

For a time she was under personal contract to Robert Siodmak.

Gynt was also in Mr. Perrin and Mr. Traill (1949) and Shadow of the Eagle (1950); she later successfully sued the makers of the latter for money owed. She supported George Raft in I'll Get You for This (1951), partly shot in Italy.

Her British films started to be regularly played on American television. This led to her receiving an offer from MGM to star in Soldiers Three (1951).

Back in Britain, Gynt returned to "B" movies: Whispering Smith Hits London (1952), The Ringer (1952), I'm a Stranger (1953), Three Steps in the Dark (1954), Forbidden Cargo (1954), Devil's Point (1954), See How They Run (1955), The Blue Peter (1955) and My Wife's Family (1956). She also appeared as a glamorous Saxon aristocrat in the 1956 episode "The Friar's Pilgrimage" of the British TV series The Adventures of Robin Hood.

In 1957, Gynt had a support part in Fortune Is a Woman and took the lead in Morning Call. She starred in episode "Shadow on the Screen" of the 1958 TV series The Invisible Man. In 1959, she took the lead in The Crowning Touch and had a support role in Bluebeard's Ten Honeymoons. 

In 1963, her last film was The Runaway (released by Columbia Pictures in 1966), in which she played the lead.

Personal life 
Reportedly, she adopted the name Gynt after she heard a pianist playing Edvard Grieg's Peer Gynt Suite in a hotel in London in the late 1930s. In her 1938 radio interview with NRK she states her husband exclaimed "What's this?" and her name was born.

Gynt was married four times. Her last husband was Frederick Moore, a plastic surgeon, who died in 1983. She semi-retired after marrying him and was out of the public spotlight by the mid-1960s. She was the sister of second unit photographer Egil "Gil" Woxholt (1926–1991), who photographed scenes in the 1965 film The Heroes of Telemark, On Her Majesty's Secret Service, A View to a Kill, and many others.

Filmography 

 The Song to Her (1934) (as Greta Woxholt)
 It Happened in Paris (1935)
 Boys Will Be Girls (1937)
 The Last Curtain (1937)
 Second Best Bed (1938)
 The Last Barricade (1938)
 Sexton Blake and the Hooded Terror (1938)
 Too Dangerous to Live (1939)
 She Couldn't Say No (1939)
 The Arsenal Stadium Mystery (1939)
 The Dark Eyes of London (1939)
 Bulldog Sees It Through (1939)
 The Middle Watch (1940)
 Two for Danger (1940)
 Room for Two (1940)
 Crook's Tour (1941)
 The Common Touch (1941)
 Tomorrow We Live (1943)
 It's That Man Again (1943)
 Mr. Emmanuel (1944)
 London Town (1946)
 Dear Murderer (1947)
 Take My Life (1947)
 Easy Money (1948)
 The Calendar (1948)
 Mr. Perrin and Mr. Traill (1948)
 Shadow of the Eagle (1950)
 I'll Get You for This (1951)
 The Rival of the Empress (1951)
 Soldiers Three (1951)
 Whispering Smith Hits London (1952)
 The Ringer (1952)
 I'm a Stranger (1952)
 Three Steps in the Dark (1953)
 Destination Milan (1954)
 Forbidden Cargo (1954)
 Devil's Point (1954)
 Born for Trouble (1955)
 See How They Run (1955)
 The Blue Peter (1955)
 My Wife's Family (1956)
 Fortune Is a Woman (1957)
 Morning Call (1957)
 The Crowning Touch (1959)
 The Witness (1959)
 Bluebeard's Ten Honeymoons (1960)
 The Runaway (1963)

References 

 
 http://www.encyclopedia.com/women/dictionaries-thesauruses-pictures-and-press-releases/gynt-greta-1916-2000

External links 
 Obituary in The Guardian
 

1916 births
2000 deaths
Norwegian film actresses
Norwegian female dancers
Musicians from Oslo
Norwegian expatriates in the United Kingdom
20th-century Norwegian actresses
20th-century Norwegian women singers
20th-century Norwegian singers